Gaiadendron is a genus of parasitic shrubs or trees in the family Loranthaceae. It solely comprises the species Gaiadendron punctatum, which is found in North and South America.

References

Parasitic plants
Loranthaceae
Loranthaceae genera
Trees of Nicaragua
Trees of Peru